The city of Plymouth, Devon, England is bounded by Dartmoor to the north, the Hamoaze to the west, the open expanse of water called Plymouth Sound to the south and the river Plym to the east.

The Cattewater is that stretch of water where the mouth of the river Plym merges with Plymouth Sound, just to the east of Sutton Pool. It is around this Pool that the manor of Sutton started, which grew to form the present day city. On the northern shore of this confluence of waters there was a rock outcrop, which it was claimed, had the appearance of a cat. This gave its name to this stretch of water and eventually the name of Cattedown to the adjoining wharves and commercial area. Apart from an occasional small oil tanker the area is now used mostly by fishing trawlers, yachts, and smaller pleasure craft. There is a water taxi across it from the Mayflower Steps on Plymouth Barbican to Mount Batten and also Oreston both on the southern bank.

The spelling 'Cattewater' is not old or consistent. Local sources and texts together with early maps and drawings refer to the opening of the estuary variously as Catwater, Cat Water and Catt Water. Internet search engines throw up other versions.

See also
Cattewater Wreck
Laira

References

External links 

Geography of Plymouth, Devon